John Hungerford (c 1566 – 18 March 1635) was an English politician who sat in the House of Commons at various times between 1597 and 1611.

Hungerford was the son of Anthony Hungerford of Downe Ampney, Wiltshire and his wife Bridget Shelley, daughter of John Shelley. He matriculated at St John's College, Oxford on 12 April 1583, aged 17.

He was a J.P. for Gloucestershire and Wiltshire from 1588 and was knighted in 1591. For 1592–93 he was High Sheriff of Wiltshire and for 1597–98 High Sheriff of Gloucestershire.  He  was awarded  MA on 9 July 1594. In 1597, Hungerford was elected Member of Parliament for Gloucestershire. He took an interest in  Cricklade and in 1601 built the market house in the High Street, and a flying buttress for the Lady Chapel of St Sampson’s Church. He was elected MP for Cricklade in 1604. He was a Gentleman of the Privy Chamber to King James I and was Deputy Lieutenant for Gloucestershire in 1628.

Hungerford died in 1635 "honourable in his life, serviceable to his King and country, liberal to his friends, charitable to the poor and courteous to all".

Hungerford married firstly  Mary Berkeley daughter of Sir Richard Berkeley  and secondly Anna Goddard daughter of Edward Goddard.  He was the brother of Anthony Hungerford of Black Bourton.

References

1560s births
1635 deaths
People from Gloucestershire
Alumni of St John's College, Oxford
High Sheriffs of Wiltshire
High Sheriffs of Gloucestershire
Year of birth uncertain
English MPs 1597–1598
English MPs 1604–1611
Members of Parliament for Cricklade